SS Caledonia was a British ocean liner that was built in Scotland in 1905 and converted into a troop ship in 1914. She was sunk by a German U-boat in the Mediterranean in 1916.

Building and civilian service
D. and W. Henderson and Company in Glasgow built Caledonia as yard number 438 for the Anchor Line. She was launched on 22 October 1904 and completed in 1905. She had berths for 1,350 passengers: 250 in first class, 350 in second class and 850 in third class.

Caledonia had twin screws, each driven by a three-cylinder triple expansion engine.

Anchor Line registered Caledonia at Glasgow. Her United Kingdom official number was 121218 and her code letters were HCFD.

On 26 March 1905 Caledonia began her maiden voyage from Glasgow to New York. On 11 July 1914 she began her last civilian voyage on this route.

By 1913 Caledonia was equipped for wireless telegraphy. Her call sign MAI.

War service and loss
In August 1914 the Admiralty requisitioned Caledonia as a troop ship. In March 1915 she left Saint John, New Brunswick carrying members of the 26th Battalion, Canadian Expeditionary Force.

On 4 December 1916  torpedoed Caledonia in the Mediterranean about 125 miles east of Malta. During the engagement, Caledonia tried to ram U-65, causing slight damage to the submarine. Caledonia sank with the loss of one or two lives (sources differ).

U-65 captured three of Caledonias survivors: her Master, Captain Blaikie, Major-General HSL Ravenshaw, commander of the British Army's 27th Division, and his adjutant, Captain Vickermann. The German government threatened to put Captain Blaikie on trial as a franc-tireur, and execute him, as it had done to another British merchant captain, Charles Fryatt, that July. Britain responded by threatening to execute a German officer of similar rank if Captain Blaikie were executed. Germany relented, and transferred Blaikie to a prisoner of war camp.

See also

Citations

Bibliography

1904 ships
Ocean liners of the United Kingdom
Ships built on the River Clyde
Ships sunk by German submarines in World War I
Steamships of the United Kingdom
Troop ships of the United Kingdom
World War I ships of the United Kingdom